The 1976 Cork Senior Football Championship was the 88th staging of the Cork Senior Football Championship since its establishment by the Cork County Board in 1887. The draw for the opening round fixtures took place on 24 January 1976.

Nemo Rangers entered the championship as the defending champions, however, they were beaten by St. Finbarr's in the semi-finals.

The final was played on 14 November 1976 at the newly-opened Páirc Uí Chaoimh in Cork, between St. Finbarr's and St. Michael's, in what was their first ever meeting in the final. St. Finbarr's won the match by 1-10 tp 1-07 to claim their fourth championship title overall and a first title in 17 years. 

Billy Field was the championship's top scorer with 1-30.

Team changes

To Championship

Promoted from the Cork Intermediate Football Championship
 Bantry Blues

Results

First round

Second round

Quarter-finals

Semi-finals

Final

Championship statistics

Top scorers
Overall

In a single game

Miscellaneous

 St. Finbarr's win their first title since 1959.
 St. Michael's qualify for their first final.

Championship statistics

Miscellaneous

 This was the first final to be played at the newly built Páirc Uí Chaoimh.

References

Cork Senior Football Championship